Monocymbium is a genus of African plants in the grass family.

 Species
 Monocymbium ceresiiforme (Nees) Stapf - widespread in sub-Saharan Africa from Liberia to Ethiopia to Cape Province
 Monocymbium deightonii C.E.Hubb. - Guinea, Sierra Leone, Ivory Coast, Liberia
 Monocymbium lanceolatum C.E.Hubb. - Guinea, Sierra Leone

References

Andropogoneae
Grasses of Africa
Poaceae genera
Taxa named by Christian Gottfried Daniel Nees von Esenbeck